The Buick Wildcat EV Concept is an electric concept car that was presented by Buick in June 2022. It foreshadows the first of the brand's range of electric vehicles.

History
The Wildcat EV concept was introduced on June 2, 2022, alongside the Buick Electra-X Concept. It is noted for the redesigned corporate Trishield emblem, which ditches the ring and separates the shields from each other. The insides of the shields feature colored "swooshes", retaining the red, white, and blue color scheme of the old logo. It also appears that the new emblem can light up as well, similar to Lincoln's illuminated star emblem.

The Wildcat EV takes its name from the full-size car of the same name, which in turn was named after a series of 1950s Buick concept cars.

References

Wildcat EV
Electric concept cars